is the 68th single from the Japanese girl group Morning Musume. It was released on January 22, 2020.

Information
This was the debut single for 15th generation members Rio Kitagawa, Homare Okamura, and Mei Yamazaki.
Both "Lovepedia" and "Ningen Kankei No Way Way" are written by Kodama Ameko and composed by Ooyagi Hiroo. Although the melody is the same, the lyrics, the arrangement, dance, and even the part division of the song are different.

Featured lineup
 9th generation: Mizuki Fukumura, Erina Ikuta
 10th generation: Ayumi Ishida, Masaki Sato
 11th generation: Sakura Oda
 12th generation: Miki Nonaka, Maria Makino, Akane Haga
 13th generation: Kaede Kaga, Reina Yokoyama
 14th generation: Chisaki Morito
 15th th generation: Rio Kitagawa, Homare Okamura, Mei Yamazaki

Kokoro & Karada Vocalists

Main Voc: Mizuki Fukumura, Masaki Sato, Sakura Oda

Minor Voc: Erina Ikuta, Ayumi Ishida, Miki Nonaka, Maria Makino, Akane Haga, Kaede Kaga, Reina Yokoyama, Chisaki Morito, Rio Kitagawa, Homare Okamura, Mei Yamazaki

Lovepedia Vocalists

Main Voc: Maria Makino, Kaede Kaga, Reina Yokoyama, Mei Yamazaki

Center Voc: Erina Ikuta, Ayumi Ishida, Miki Nonaka, Akane Haga, Rio Kitagawa, Homare Okamura

Minor Voc: Mizuki Fukumura, Masaki Sato, Sakura Oda, Chisaki Morito

Ningen Kankei No Way Way Vocalists

Main Voc: Mizuki Fukumura, Masaki Sato, Sakura Oda, Miki Nonaka, Akane Haga, Kaede Kaga, Reina Yokoyama

Center Voc: Erina Ikuta, Ayumi Ishida, Maria Makino, Rio Kitagawa

Minor Voc: Chisaki Morito, Homare Okamura, Mei Yamazaki

Track listing

CD 
 Kokoro & Karada
 Lovepedia
 Ningen Kankei No Way Way
 Kokoro & Karada (Instrumental)
 Lovepedia (Instrumental)
 Ningen Kankei No Way Way (Instrumental)

Limited Edition A DVD 
 Kokoro & Karada (Music Video)

Limited Edition B DVD 
 Lovepedia (Music Video)

Limited Edition C DVD 
 Ningen Kankei No Way Way (Music Video)

Limited Edition SP DVD 
 Kokoro & Karada (Dance Shot Ver.)
 Lovepedia (Dance Shot Ver.)
 Ningen Kankei No Way Way (Dance Shot Ver.)

Event V 
 Kokoro & Karada (Close-up Ver.)
 Lovepedia (Close-up Ver.)
 Ningen Kankei No Way Way (Close-up Ver.)

Charts Positions

Oricon

Daily and Weekly

Billboard Japan Top Single Sales

References 

Morning Musume songs
2020 singles
Zetima Records singles
Songs written by Tsunku
Hello! Project
Japanese dance-pop songs